Kohabiro Dam is a gravity concrete & fill dam (compound) dam located in Akita Prefecture in Japan. The dam is used for flood control. The catchment area of the dam is 29.8 km2. The dam impounds about 37  ha of land when full and can store 1671 thousand cubic meters of water. The construction of the dam was completed in 1972.

References

Dams in Akita Prefecture
1972 establishments in Japan